George Kramer may refer to:

George Kramer (philatelist), American philatelist
George Kramer (chess player) (born 1929), American chess player
George W. Kramer (1848–1938), architect
George Kramer, a character in Mannix played by Larry Linville